This is a list of the line-ups of the Plastic Ono Band, the backing band established by John Lennon and Yoko Ono. It was active in various incarnations from 1969 to 1974, and was revived by Ono from 2009 until 2015. The group had a constantly shifting line-up, so this page reflects each individual incarnation under the name.

Line-ups

Timeline

Classic timeline

Recent timeline

References

Plastic Ono Band
John Lennon
Yoko Ono
Plastic Ono Band